Big Springs (also Bigsprings, Chestnut Grove, or Fort Evans) is an unincorporated community in Calhoun County, West Virginia, United States.  It lies along West Virginia Route 16 to the north of the town of Grantsville, the county seat of Calhoun County.   Its elevation is 771 feet (235 m).  It has a post office with the ZIP code 26137.

The community was so named on account of there being springs near the original town site.

References

Unincorporated communities in Calhoun County, West Virginia
Unincorporated communities in West Virginia